Multiclavula caput-serpentis is a species of terricolous (ground-dwelling) basidiolichen in the family Hydnaceae. Found in Panama, it was formally described as a new species in 2021 by Hermine Lotz-Winter and Kai Reschke. The species epithet, which combines the Latin roots caput ("head") and serpens ("snake"), alludes to the shape of the fruitbodies.

References

Hydnaceae
Lichen species
Lichens described in 2021
Lichens of Central America
Basidiolichens